The Japan National Trust (日本ナショナルトラスト) is an organization which works to preserve and protect the heritage of Japan.

History
In 1964, a newspaper article entitled "Destruction of the Nature" written by novelist Osaragi Jiro (大仏次郎) described the activity of British National Trust. A foundation, "Scenic Resources Preservation Foundation" (観光資源保護財団) was founded in 1968. It later changed its name to the "Japan National Trust".

The Japan National Trust has reciprocal visiting rights with National Trusts in other countries.

External links
Japan National Trust in English
Japan National Trust in Japanese

Cultural organizations based in Japan
National trusts
1968 establishments in Japan
Organizations established in 1968